Riedmatt is a railway station in the Swiss canton of Schwyz and municipality of Wollerau. The station is located on the Pfäffikon SZ–Arth-Goldau railway line, owned by the Südostbahn. It is an intermediate stop on Zurich S-Bahn service S40, from Einsiedeln to Rapperswil.

References 

Riedmatt
Riedmatt